Second Chance is a 1996 American comedy Sci-Fi film directed by Lyman Dayton.

Plot 
Three scientists invent a youth serum, but they're forced to flee their lab as a group of mercenaries try to take it for the  wealthy old man who hired them, capturing the head of the lab in the process. While hiding, they take some of their own serum to become twenty years old again, but because of a faulty dosage they end up as six years old. In need of the antidote, they face the task of getting back into the lab in the bodies of first graders.

Cast 
Richard Hatch as Mitch
Cylk Cozart as Brad
George LePorte as Stan
Nicholas Walker as Nelson Stafford
Arte Johnson as Dr. Josef Stiggens
Michael Becker as Little Mitch
Ryan Peterson as Little Stan
Zachary Ellington as Little Brad

Others names
The movie was named differently in the following languages.
 France : Une découverte dangereuse 
 Germany : Second Chance - Alles auf Anfang
 Hungary : Végső esély
 Italy : Ragazzi ci siamo ristretti

References

External links 
 

1996 films
1990s English-language films
American science fiction comedy films
1990s science fiction comedy films
Films about rapid human age change
1990s American films